J. Fount Tillman (1854 – March 1899) was an American politician who was the eighth Register of the Treasury, serving during the second term of President Grover Cleveland. As Register of the Treasury, Tillman's signature appeared on US currency issued between July 1, 1893, and December 2, 1897.

Prior to working for the Treasury, Tillman served one term in the Tennessee State Legislature.  He also served as the Secretary of the National Farmers' Alliance.  Tillman became the Register of the Treasury after working for the 1892 electoral campaign of Grover Cleveland.  After retiring from public service, Tillman entered private business and conducted dealings in New York City and Washington, DC.

Tillman inherited Palmetto Farm in Marshall County, Tennessee from his father-in-law, Thomas Montgomery, after the Civil War. He died at the age of 45 in  Palmetto, Tennessee.

References

Further reading
 New York Times Review

1854 births
1899 deaths
People from Marshall County, Tennessee
Members of the Tennessee House of Representatives
19th-century American politicians